Body powder is the generic name for alternatives to talcum powder. It is usually made from a combination of tapioca flour, rice flour, cornstarch, kaolin, arrowroot powder, and/or orrisroot powder, but also other powders may be used. In addition, water absorbing and water binding agents may be added such as polyacrylamide.

References 

Cosmetics
Powders